The sixth season of The Bachelorette Australia premiered on Wednesday, 7 October 2020. In an Australian first, the season features Newcastle, New South Wales sisters Elly Miles, a 25-year-old nurse, and Becky Miles, a 30-year-old defence contracting specialist as Bachelorettes. Together, they will court 20 men. Elly previously appeared on the seventh season of The Bachelor Australia, where she finished in fifth place.

Contestants
The season began with 20 contestants, who were revealed on 5 October 2020.

Call-Out Order

Colour Key

	
 The contestant received the first impression "country rose", having the opportunity to go on the first double date and choose a Bachelor to join him on the date.
 The contestant received a rose during a date.
 The contestant received a rose outside of a date or the rose ceremony.
 The contestant was eliminated outside the rose ceremony.
 The contestant was eliminated.
 The contestant quit the competition.
 The contestant won the competition.

Notes

Episodes

Episode 1
Original airdate: 7 October 2020

Episode 2
Original airdate: 8 October 2020

Episode 3
Original airdate: 14 October 2020

Episode 4
Original airdate: 15 October 2020

Episode 5
Original airdate: 21 October 2020

Episode 6
Original airdate: 22 October 2020

Episode 7
Original airdate: 28 October 2020

Episode 8
Original airdate: 29 October 2020

Episode 9
Original airdate: 4 November 2020

Episode 10
Original airdate: 5 November 2020

Ratings

References

Australian (season 06)
2020 Australian television seasons
Television series impacted by the COVID-19 pandemic
Television shows filmed in Australia